Akysis longifilis is a species of catfish belonging to the family Akysidae, the stream catfishes. It is only known to inhabit the Sittang River basin in southern Myanmar.

As a small catfish, it is up to  standard length, with a dark brown body marked with yellowish saddle-shaped markings, very long barbels, and a forked caudal fin.

References

External links 

Akysidae
Fish described in 2006
Fish of Myanmar
Endemic fauna of Myanmar